Charlene Vickers (born 1970) is an Anishnabe, specifically Ojibwa, artist from Kenora, Ontario currently living and working in Vancouver, British Columbia. She graduated from the Emily Carr Institute of Art and Design and received an MFA from Simon Fraser University. She is on the board of directors at grunt gallery in Vancouver, BC.  Her work Sleeman Makazin is in the permanent collections at the Museum of Anthropology at University of British Columbia (UBC) in Vancouver, BC. She creates political work and, in one work, she responds to "the plight of missing and murdered aboriginal women in British Columbia".

Select solo exhibitions 
 Brown Skin Before Red. Richmond, BC: Richmond Art Gallery, 2008.
 Ominjimendaan/ to remember. Vancouver, BC: grunt gallery, 2012.
 Ominjimendaan/ to remember. Winnipeg, MB: Urban Shaman Contemporary Aboriginal Art Gallery, 2012.
 Asemaa/Tobacco. Vancouver, BC: Artspeak, 2015.

Select group exhibitions 
 Charlene Vickers and Judy Chartrand : Two/many Tribulations. Vancouver, BC: grunt gallery, 2004. Curated by Warren, Daina.
 Charlene Vickers, Deborah Koenker, Mae Leong, and Femke van Delft : Tracking Absence. Toronto, BC: A Space, 2006.
 Charlene Vickers and Maria Hupfield : Vestige Vagabond. Brooklyn, NY: Panoply Performance Lab, 2014.
 (Upcoming) Vancouver Special: Ambivalent Pleasures. Curated by: Daina Augaitis and Jesse McKee. Vancouver Art Gallery, 2017.

Awards 
 2018: VIVA Award (alongside with Hannah Jickling and Helen Reed

References 

Living people
21st-century Canadian artists
21st-century Canadian women artists
1970 births
Ojibwe people
First Nations performance artists
First Nations women artists